The First Krechowce Uhlan Regiment was a mounted unit of the Polish Army, active in the Second Polish Republic. Its traditions were continued during World War II, by a regiment of the same name, which was part of Polish Armed Forces in the West. 1st Krechowce Uhlan Regiment was formed in 1915, as a unit of the Imperial Russian Army. It fought in World War I, Polish–Soviet War and the Invasion of Poland, as part of Suwalska Cavalry Brigade. Until 1939, the regiment was stationed in Augustów. It ceased to exist in 1947. First commandant of the regiment was a Tsarist officer of Polish ethnicity, Colonel Bolesław Mościcki, who was killed in 1918 near Luninets. Last commandant was Colonel Leon Strzelecki.

First Uhlan Regiment was formed in 1915, as part of Imperial Russian Army’s Puławy Legion. To commemorate its first victorious battle against German forces, the Battle of Krechowce, which took place on July 24, 1917, the Regiment was named after the village of Krechowce near Stanisławów. Dissolved in May 1918, it was recreated in November of the same year by the Regency Council. From December 1918 until August 1919, it fought in the Polish–Ukrainian War, making itself famous after the defence of Gródek Jagielloński. In early 1920, the Regiment was transferred to Pomerelia, where it took place in the so-called Poland's Wedding to the Sea (Puck, February 10, 1920).

During the Polish–Soviet War of 1919 - 1921, the Regiment fought mostly in Volhynia, engaging in a number of battles and skirmishes against 1st Cavalry Army of Semyon Budyonny. After the war, in spring 1921, it occupied former barracks of Imperial Russian Army in northern town of Augustów, where it remained until 1939. During the Invasion of Poland, the Regiment, as part of Suwalska Cavalry Brigade, fought on until October 6, 1939, taking part in the Battle of Kock.

In the second half of 1941, the Regiment was recreated as part of Polish Armed Forces in the East, the so-called Anders' Army. In mid-1942, after the Army of Władysław Anders had left the Soviet Union, the Regiment was renamed into First Regiment of Armoured Cavalry, and in September 1942 was sent for training to British Iraq, where it remained until October 1943. After the return to Palestine, the Regiment was equipped with M4 Sherman tanks, completing its training in December 1943 in Egypt.

During the Italian Campaign, First Krechowce Uhlan Regiment was part of 2nd Warsaw Armoured Brigade. It fought in the Battle of Monte Cassino, the Battle of Ancona, and captured the city of Bologna. The regiment was dissolved in 1947.

Tradition of the Regiment 
First Uhlan Regiment claimed to be the continuation of the 1st Court Uhlan Regiment, which existed in the Polish–Lithuanian Commonwealth in the late 18th century (1776–1792-1794). In 1815 - 1831, the Regiment was part of forces of Congress Poland, and as such, fought in the November Uprising, after which it was dissolved, together with whole army of Congress Poland.

In December 1914, during early months of World War I, Russian authorities announced the creation of two volunteer cavalry squadrons, as part of the so-called Puławy Legion. By mid January 1915, First Squadron was ready, and in the next 12 months the number of squadrons increased to such an extent, that Polish Ulan Division was created, with its headquarters in Babruysk. On March 23, 1917, the Division swore its oath, and on April 3, it was renamed into 1st Uhlan Regiment. In June 1917, the Regiment was sent to the area of Ternopil and Kalush. On July 19, Colonel Bolesław Mościcki was named its commandant.

On July 22, 1917, Polish uhlans entered Stanisławów. The city was burning, plundered by marauders of the Russian Imperial Army. The uhlans moved in to protect its civilian population, and five days later they fought German units in the Battle of Krechowce. After this battle, the Regiment was moved to Bessarabia, and finally, in early 1918, it returned to Babruysk. Following the agreement with German forces, the Regiment was dissolved on May 21, 1918. Soon after the Battle of Krechowce, the unit came to be called the Krechowce Regiment. In 1919, its official name was changed into First Krechowce Uhlan Regiment of Colonel Bolesław Mościcki.

Second Polish Republic 
The Regiment was dissolved in May 1918, but in October of that year, the Regency Council ordered creation of additional units of the newly created Polish Army. On November 4, 1918, First Uhlan Regiment was recreated, and to increase the flow of volunteers, its recruiting offices were opened in several locations. 2nd Squadron was formed in Warsaw, but on November 22, it was moved to Kielce. Colonel Dunin-Markiewicz, on his way to Będzin, where he was ordered to form 3rd Squadron, stopped at Wolbrom, where he met with Rittmeister Pawel Korytko, commandant of reserve squadron of 2nd Austrian Uhlan Regiment. Both officers decided to unite their forces, thus 3rd Squadron was created.

1st Squadron was formed in Radomsko, 4th Squadron in Piotrków Trybunalski, and communications platoon in Gródek Jagielloński. At first, the headquarters of the Regiment was located in Kielce: on November 17, 1918, it was moved to Wolbrom.

In early December 1918, all subunits of the Regiment concentrated in Tarnow, in order to march eastwards, and help Polish defenders of the city of Lwów, which was threatened by Ukrainian forces (see Battle of Lemberg (1918)). On December 17 the soldiers went by train to Przemyśl, and all throughout winter of 1918/1919, the uhlans fought in the area of Lwów, mainly in Gródek Jagielloński.

In early spring 1919, the Regiment, which suffered heavy losses, was transferred back to Wolbrom. Meanwhile, its flag had been brought from Bobrujsk, and on May 7, 1919, the Regiment left Wolbrom again, towards Volhynia, where Polish offensive began (see Polish–Ukrainian War). The Regiment, with its quick movement, took the Ukrainians by surprise, capturing the city of Lutsk, together with 600 prisoners, cannons, vehicles and food. On May 23, after a few days’ rest at Horochów, the uhlans captured Brody and Radziwiłłów. As a result of this success, the Poles seized 3000 prisoners, several trains (including armoured train Sich Riflemen, which was immediately renamed into General Dowbor), machine guns and cannons.

In early July 1919, the Regiment was merged with 9th Uhlan Regiment, creating 5th Cavalry Brigade. It operated in eastern Volhynia, capturing Zdołbunów (August 12), and in the autumn 1919, following the order of Polish Army Headquarters, was moved to Polish Pomerelia.

Pomerelia 
On October 29, 1919, the Regiment arrived at Ciechocinek, remaining there until January 16, 1920. On the next day, Polish troops crossed former Russian - Prussian border, and entered Pomerelia. After a few weeks’ march via Chełmża, Popowo Biskupie, Grudziądz, Nowe, Pelplin and Żukowo the uhlans reached Puck, where on February 10, 1920, Poland's Wedding to the Sea took place, with General Józef Haller present.

Polish - Soviet War 
In mid-April 1920, the Regiment was transferred back to Volhynia, where it joined the Cavalry Division of General Jan Romer. Its task was to capture the town of Koziatyn, with its important rail station and Red Army supply depot. In two days, Polish cavalry, with 20 officers, 600 soldiers and 10 machine guns, crossed 160 kilometers (see Battle of Koziatyn). The raid was a spectacular success, as Poles captured the town, with a number of prisoners of war.

After a short rest, on May 2, 1920, the Regiment headed towards Bila Tserkva, pushing away Soviet forces. On May 15, the Regiment concentrated in Stara Syniava, where it received a new commandant, General Aleksander Karnicki. In late May 1920, the Regiment defeated Siemion Budionnyi's First Cavalry Army in the Battle of Wolodarka.

Following Soviet counterattack to the Polish Kiev Offensive, the Regiment began to retreat westwards. By June 19, it defended the line of the Sluch River, with heavy losses, which shrank its manpower. In late July 1920, the Regiment was sent to Tarnow, to recuperate and increase its refill its ranks with new recruits. On July 22, the unit came to Zamość, joining the forces of General Juliusz Rómmel. Until August 8 it fought along the Styr River, but due to numerical superiority of the enemy, it was forced to retreat to Radziechów. Pushed by the enemy, the Regiment crossed the Bug River, entering Żółkiew. There, it attacked a wing of the Budionnyi army. On August 29, the Regiment captured Tyszowce, and then fought the Soviets near Zamość, in the famous Battle of Komarów.

By mid-September, the Regiment re-entered Volhynia, chasing the retreating Bolsheviks. As part of General Juliusz Rómmel’s Cavalry Corps, in October 1920 it captured Korosten. Soon afterwards, armistice was declared.

Interbellum Period 
In winter 1920/21, the Regiment camped near Lutsk. In spring 1921, it was moved to Hrubieszów, and then to Augustów, to its garrison, located in former barracks of the Imperial Russian Army. On July 24, 1925, it celebrated its 10th Anniversary, with General Władysław Sikorski present. On July 24, 1932, it celebrated its 15th Anniversary, with President Ignacy Mościcki, and a number of high-ranking military officials, such as Edward Smigly-Rydz, Tadeusz Kutrzeba, Juliusz Rómmel and Stanisław Grzmot-Skotnicki. In 1927, the Association of Krechowce Officers was created, which organized meetings and balls. In the early 1920s, a village in Volhynia was (Osada Krechowiecka) was settled with veterans of the Regiment (see Osadnik), and in 1935, Officers’ Yacht Club with its own pier was opened on Biale Augustowskie Lake (this lake came to be known as Krechowce Lake). Residents of the Osada Krechowiecka village were in 1940 forcibly resettled to Siberia by the NKVD.

The Regiment was famous for Krechowiak, the horse of Colonel Bolesław Mościcki, which, together with Colonel Karol Rómmel, won 10th spot at the 1924 Olympic Games in Paris. The legendary horse had its own, separate stable, and after its death in 1939, Krechowiak was handed to Polish Army Museum in Warsaw, where it was stuffed and presented to visitors. To commemorate the Battle of Krechowce, special gorgets were made, with Black Madonna of Częstochowa. The gorgets were handed to officers and uhlans after 20 years of service. In the Second Polish Republic, 1st Uhlan Regiment maintained special ties with 12th Podole Uhlan Regiment and 14th Yazlovets Uhlan Regiment: the three units had fought the Bolsheviks at Komarów.

1939 Invasion of Poland 
The mobilisation of the Regiment took place on August 24, 1939. On September 1, the unit took positions near the village of Raczki, which at that time was located 10 kilometers from the border with East Prussia.

In the night of September 2/3, 1939, two squadrons under Colonel Antoni Burlingis and Colonel Zygmunt Nowinski attacked German border posts at the villages of Kechlensdorf (now Zocie) and Auersberg (now Turowo). The Regiment planned a raid on East Prussia, but Polish Army headquarters did not support this idea. Following the orders, the Regiment withdrew towards Zambrów and Tykocin. On September 6, the Wehrmacht broke through Polish defences, and crossed the Narew near Różan. As a result, elements of the Regiment were engaged in hand-to-hand combat with subunits of the Panzer Division Kempf.

On September 10, after a short rest, the Regiment took positions near the folwark of Wadolki-Borowe, with its left wing supported by 71st Infantry Regiment of 18th Infantry Division. Soon it was attacked by German 20th Motorized Infantry Division. First enemy assault was repelled, but in subsequent attacks, Colonel Jan Litewski, commandant of the Regiment, was killed and his post was taken temporarily by Rittmeister Tomasz Mineyko, who ordered a withdrawal. The Battle of Zambrów ended in Polish defeat.

After a short rest the regiment marched towards the forests near Dąbrowa Wielka. In the night of September 12, remnants of 2nd Uhlan Regiment, destroyed by the Wehrmacht in the Battle of Wizna, reached the same forest. Colonel Karol Anders of 2nd Regiment took over command of the united forces. On the next day a column of German motorized infantry set off from Czyżew, trying to destroy Polish cavalry. Near the village of Kamien, Polish soldiers halted the enemy, destroying 10 tanks and capturing a number of prisoners.

In the night, after a quick march, the uhlans reached the road Wysokie Mazowieckie - Brańsk, crossing the Mien river after a bloody skirmish with the enemy. In the morning of September 13, the regiment reached the area of Hodyszewo. After a meeting of officers, the uhlans were ordered to fight their way to the Białowieża Forest. In case of a failure, the regiment was to head towards Wołkowysk, where Reserve Center of Suwalska Cavalry Brigade was located. Near Olszewo, Polish soldiers faced an armored regiment of German 3rd Panzer Division. The Germans lost 20 tanks and armored carriers, but Polish losses also were very heavy and the regiment dispersed, as some of its subunits decided to march to Wołkowysk on their own.

On September 16, the uhlans finally reached Białowieża, where the remnants of the regiments were incorporated into Cavalry Brigade Edward, named after Colonel Edward Milewski. On September 21, the regiment arrived at the village of Teresin. Soon afterwards, a skirmish with the Red Army, advancing from the East, took place in which the Poles lost 5 soldiers. Marching south, Polish 3rd Regiment of Mounted Rifles entered the village of Kalenkowicze near Kamieniec, whose residents had built “welcome gates” for the Red Army, adorned with red flags and Soviet symbols. As a reprisal for this betrayal, Kalenkowicze was burned.

On September 24, the 1st Regiment, which was part of Brigade Edward, Zaza Cavalry Division (named after General Zygmunt Podhorski) crossed the Bug River near Niemirow and kept marching southwards. Fighting its way against Soviet and German units, the uhlans hoped to eventually reach the Hungarian border, located hundreds of kilometers south. On September 28 the Division reached Ostrów Lubelski, where it met with forces of Independent Operational Group Polesie. General Podhorski suggested that the two groups join forces and march towards the border, but General Franciszek Kleeberg preferred to aid the besieged garrison of Warsaw.

Brigade Edward was ordered to protect the Wieprz river crossing at Kijany. After several German attacks, it had to retreat behind the river. On September 30, uhlans of the Zaza Cavalry Division merged with the Polesie Operational Group. In the Battle of Kock (1939), 1st Krechowce Uhlan Regiment was stationed near Józefów, and tasked with attacking left wing of German positions. Due to heavy enemy fire, the uhlans were unable to achieve success, and retreated to Grabowo Szlacheckie. At midday of October 6, Polish forces capitulated.

During the September Campaign, First Krechowce Uhlan Regiment was commanded by Colonel Jan Litewski, and his deputy, Colonel Karol Anders.

First Krechowce Uhlan Regiment was recreated in the second half of 1941, as part of Polish Armed Forces in the East.

Sources 
 Grzegorz Krogulec: 1 Pułk Ułanów Krechowieckich im. płk. Bolesława Mościckiego. Warszawa: Mikromax, 1990
 Henryk Smaczny: Księga kawalerii polskiej 1914-1947: rodowody, barwa, broń. Warszawa: TESCO, 1989
 Andrzej Suchcitz: Dzieje 1 Pułku Ułanów Krechowieckich 1941-1947. Londyn: Koło Krechowiaków, 2002
 rtm. Aleksander Wojciechowski 1 Pułk Ułanów Krechowieckich (z cyklu Zarys historii wojennej pułków polskich 1918-1920) wyd. Warszawa 1929

See also 
 Stefan Tyszkiewicz
 Polish cavalry
 2nd Regiment of Grochow Uhlans

Military units and formations established in 1915
Military units and formations of Poland in World War II
Polish Land Forces
Cavalry regiments of Poland
Białystok Voivodeship (1919–1939)